Kesar (saffron) is an Indian television serial that aired on Star Plus from 19 April 2004 to 31 May 2007. The story follows the life of a young girl named Kesar.

The series was supposed to go on air as Karvachauth on Zee TV. However, as things didn't work out between the channel and production house, it was later granted permission by Star Plus and it went on air as Kesar.

Plot
Kesar (Nandini Singh) is a traditional Punjabi girl living with her large extended family in a village. She gets an offer of marriage from the wealthy Maliya family, living in a big city. Kesar marries Rudra (Nikhil Arya), the son of the Maliyas. She tries her best to cope with the sophisticated urban lifestyle of her new family. But soon she finds herself trapped in a web of deceit. It is revealed that Rudra and his mother Pam have conspired against the innocent Kesar for the sake of some valuable inheritance. Kesar's life goes through a great deal of turmoil. She finds support from Rudra's friend Abhi, who loves her selflessly. But Abhi dies a tragic and early death. His heart is transplanted into the body of Harman (Yash Tonk), who begins to experience the same feelings of love for Kesar. Meanwhile, Kesar has given birth to Rudra's daughter Muskaan. Rudra dies in a bomb blast. After many more troubles, Kesar decides to marry Harman. However, they are separated by adverse circumstances.

Going through these vicissitudes, Kesar gets a new face and identity as Kavita (played by Prachi Shah). She marries Police Commissioner Arjun Gill and brings up Abhimanyu, his son from his first marriage, as her own. She continues to miss her daughter Muskaan and her adopted son Krish. Later on, Kesar is reunited with her daughter Muskaan. The secret that Kesar and Kavita are the same person comes out before everyone. Kesar continues to live with Arjun  and Muskaan. Krish lives with Harman. Harman is married to Nupur but remains good friends with Kesar.
 
Nupur becomes jealous of Harman and Kesar's relationship. Nupur tries to kill Kesar, but instead hurts Harman and he became blind. The only person to know this is Nupur and Harman's daughter Khwaish. Krish meets Khushali, and they fall in love. Muskaan and Rohan meet and fall in love too. On their engagement night, Kesar finds out Rohan's real name is Ajay and he was married before. Krish and Khushali get engaged but Muskaan and Rohan do not. Rohan leaves the house but tells everyone that he had already informed Muskaan about this truth in a CD. However, Muskaan never managed to watch it. Later, the misunderstanding is cleared up. Muskaan decides to get back with Rohan, but on her engagement night, she is almost strangled to death. The person who wants to kill Muskaan is Naina, her wedding planner. Naina has loved Rohan for a long time but he does not love her. On Muskaan and Rohan's wedding day, police arrest him for killing his first wife. Naina is actually the one who has killed Rohan's first wife. She gathers evidence against Rohan and shows it to the police, so that his marriage will be delayed. Kesar and Arjun support Rohan. They compel Naina to admit that she killed Rohan's first wife. Naina then commits suicide.

Muskaan and Rohan get together. Then, on the day of their marriage, Muskaan refuses to marry Rohan. Abhimanyu is in love with Muskaan and has confessed his love for her. Then he rapes her. This matter is taken to court. Meanwhile, Nupur tells Harman that she is the reason behind his going blind. Nupur gets shot and dies. Then, one day, Arjun tries to kill Harman. The reason is that Arjun is jealous of Harman's friendship with Kesar. However, Harman tells Arjun that his eyes have healed and he can see. Arjun is shocked to hear this. Kesar then brings the police and they arrest Arjun. Meanwhile, Muskaan and Rohan have got married. But Rohan beats up Muskaan, because he thinks that she and Abhimanyu are having an affair. When Rohan realises that it is not so, he apologises to Muskaan, but she doesn't forgive him. Muskaan and Kesar then move in with Harman, Krish, Khushali and Khwaish. They all live happily in Harman's house.

Cast
 Nandini Singh as Kesar Rudra   / Kesar Abhinav Pandey / Dr.Kangana Pandey EX husband Rudra Maliya 
 Nandini Singh as Dr. Kangana Husband Dr Abhinav Pandey  (Kesar's Twins Look Alike)
 Prachi Shah as Kesar Abhinav Arjun Gill / Kavita Face Surgery 
 Eijaz Khan as Abhinav (Abhi) Pandey 
 Yash Tonk as Harman Khanna
 Nikhil Arya as Rudra Maliya 
 Nasirr Khan as Komal
 Sandiip Sikcand / Shakti Singh as Parmeet 
 Indira Krishnan as Teji 
 Madan Joshi as Dharam Maliya 
 Surekha Sikri as Saroj Dharam Maliya 
 Kitu Gidwani / Natasha Rana as Pam Vikram Maliya 
 Rocky Verma as Inspector Yashwant Patil 
 Karan Patel as Ryan Sood
 Kanika Kohli as Nitika Maliya / Nitika Ryan Sood
 Hiten Tejwani as Abhinav (Abhi) Pandey 
 Nisha Rawal as Binita 
 Aleeza Khan / Ashita Dhawan as Neha 
 Gunjan Walia as Riya Maliya
 Shubhangi Gokhale as Harman's Aunt
 Khyaati Khandke Keswani as Katrina Rudra Maliya 
 Shivalika Sharma as Nupur Harman Khanna
 Nishant Shokeen as Aseem
 Vineet Sharma as Shivam
 Iqbal Azad as  Police Commissioner Arjun Gill
 Shweta Rastogi as Muskaan Maliya
 Amit Dolawat as Krish Maliya
 Ashish Sharma as Abhimanyu Gill
 Gunjan Vijaya as Khwaish Khanna
 Ankita Bhargava as Khushali
 Poonam Gulati as Naina
 Vishal Watwani as Anand Pandey (Abhinav's Younger Brother)
 Pratima Kazmi as Shakuntala Pandey (Abhinav & Anand's Mother)
 Sanjay Batra as Vikram Maliya
 Sonali Verma as Reema Vikram Maliya
 Jaya Bhattacharya as Reema Sood
 Kavita Kaushik as Kadambari Abhinav Pandey
 Anas Rashid as Dr. Sahil
 Monalika Bhonsle as Shalini Sood
 Mazher Sayed as Dr. Walia
 Shweta Tiwari as Prerna

References

External links
 
Official website on TV Asia
Official website on STAR Plus

Balaji Telefilms television series
StarPlus original programming
Indian television series
2004 Indian television series debuts
2007 Indian television series endings
Television shows set in Punjab, India